Henry William George Lupino (16 June 1892 – 10 November 1959) professionally  Lupino Lane, was an English actor and theatre manager, and a member of the famous Lupino family, which eventually included his cousin, the screenwriter/director/actress Ida Lupino. Lane started out as a child performer, known as 'Little Nipper', and went on to appear in a wide range of theatrical, music hall and film performances. Increasingly celebrated for his silent comedy short subjects, he is best known in the United Kingdom for playing Bill Snibson in the play and film Me and My Girl, which popularized the song and dance routine "The Lambeth Walk".

Early life and career 
Lane was born in Hackney, London, son of Harry Charles Lupino (1867–1925), part of the Lupino family. He adopted the surname Lane from his great-aunt Sarah Lane (1822–1899, née Borrow), the director of the Britannia Theatre, Hoxton. Lane married actress Violet Blythe on 10 February 1917, and their son was the actor Lauri Lupino Lane (1921–86). Lane's brother was the actor Wallace Lupino, and his nephew, Wallace's son, was another actor, Richard Lupino.

Lane made his first stage appearance at the age of four in a benefit in Birmingham for Vesta Tilley. He made his London début in 1903 as Nipper Lane at the London Pavilion. He worked steadily as a performer thereafter. In 1915, he appeared at the Empire Theatre and played comic roles in theatre and film on both sides of the Atlantic from then on. In 1921, he dived through sixty three stage traps in six minutes while performing in a 1921 pantomime production of Aladdin at the Hippodrome. Lane and his wife Violet Blythe were both in the Broadway production of the musical Afgar, at the Central Theatre, in 1920–21, and he appeared in the Ziegfeld Follies of 1924 at the New Amsterdam Theatre, from June 1924 to March 1925, and subsequently played Ko-Ko in The Mikado on Broadway in 1925, receiving good reviews.

Lane's silent film career started in 1915 in a series of British short films, including the experimental Mr Butterbuns series. As a comedy actor, he appeared in 40 Hollywood films made in the 1920s.  After several shorts and features for Fox in 1922–23, Lane appeared as Rudolph in D. W. Griffith's 1924 feature Isn't Life Wonderful?. He signed with Educational Pictures for a series of short comedies that featured his acrobatic flips and falls. Roscoe Arbuckle was one of his directors, but Lane was soon directing the films himself under the pseudonym "Henry W. George" (his given names). These comedies displayed Lane's agility and versatility: in one film he played 27 characters (Only Me, 1929). Lane's brother Wallace Lupino, who usually co-starred in Lane's comedies, also starred in his own comedies, of which only three are known to survive. (Archivist Ben Model discovered one of them and posted it on YouTube.)

Lupino Lane made the transition to talking pictures, starring in a few sound shorts for Educational and making a guest appearance in the Warner Bros. feature The Show of Shows. He also played a major role in the 1929 musical film The Love Parade, but within two years he left Hollywood for his native England.

1930s 
In the 1930s, Lane directed and acted in mostly British feature films.  With Sir Oswald Stoll, Lane co-produced Twenty to One, written by L. Arthur Rose and Frank Eyton with music by Billy Mayerl, on the West End. Lane made his first appearance as Bill Snibson in this production, in which Snibson, a tout, was a big hit. The production ran for a year starting from November 1935 and went on a long British tour after that.

Me and My Girl, the follow-up show, written by Rose and Douglas Furber with music by Noel Gay, was an even bigger hit. Snibson inherits a country estate and invites his mates from Lambeth to stay with him. It featured a hit song and dance routine from Lane called "The Lambeth Walk", which became popular throughout Europe in the late 1930s. Lane directed and produced the show as well as starring in it for 1,550 performances between 1937 and 1940. It was the first British musical comedy to be televised and was made into a film in 1939. The film was known as The Lambeth Walk due to the popularity of the dance.

Later career and death 
The success of Me and My Girl made Lane a rich man. Lane continued to act on stage and on television in England for the rest of his life. In 1946, after it sustained damage during World War II, he purchased the shell of the Gaiety Theatre in London to rescue it from dereliction, intending to produce comedies. He failed to win the financial backing to refurbish it and sold it in 1950. The theatre was demolished in 1956.

He was the subject of This Is Your Life in March 1956 when he was surprised by Eamonn Andrews at London's BBC Television Theatre. He also appeared as the castaway on Desert Island Discs in 1957.

Lane died on 10 November 1959, in London, at age 67 and is buried at Streatham Park Cemetery. His wife, Violet Blythe, died 17 March 1983, aged 93.

To mark the 50th anniversary of his death, the Music Hall Guild of Great Britain and America restored his memorial at Streatham Park Cemetery and held a memorial service at St Paul's, Covent Garden, with a reception at Theatre Royal, Drury Lane.

A commemorative blue plaque was erected to Lupino Lane on 15 June 2014 at his former home 32 Maida Vale, Paddington, by The Music Hall Guild of Great Britain and America.

Partial filmography

 A Friendly Husband (1923)
 Fool's Luck (1926)
 His Private Life (1928)
 The Love Parade (1929)
 Golden Dawn (1930)
 The Yellow Mask (1930)
 Never Trouble Trouble (1931)
 No Lady (1931)
 Love Lies (1931)
 The Innocents of Chicago (1932)
 Letting in the Sunshine (1933)
 A Southern Maid (1933)
 My Old Duchess (1934)
 The Deputy Drummer (1935)
 Trust the Navy (1935)
 Who's Your Father (1935)
 Hot News (1936)
 The Lambeth Walk (1939)

DVD release
On 26 December 2012, Alpha Video released Lupino Lane Silent Comedy Collection, Volume 1 on Region 0 DVD-R.  
On 28 January 2014, they released Lupino Lane Silent Comedy Collection, Volume 2.

References

Sources

See also
 Lupino family

External links

Lupino Lane at Virtual History

 Lupino Lane on Desert Island Discs

1892 births
1959 deaths
English male film actors
English male silent film actors
English theatre managers and producers
Actor-managers
Silent film comedians
Music hall performers
20th-century English male actors
People from Hackney Central
Male actors from London
20th-century English comedians
British male comedy actors
Lupino family
Burials at Streatham Park Cemetery
20th-century theatre managers
20th-century English businesspeople